1976 in the Philippines details events of note that happened in the Philippines in the year 1976.

Incumbents

 President: Ferdinand Marcos (Independent)
 Chief Justice: Roberto Concepcion

Events

April
 April 30 – At least 28 persons are killed in a bus crash near Manila.

May
 May 20–24 – Flooding in the wake of a typhoon kills 215 persons and left 60,000 homeless in Luzon Island.
 May 21–23 – Six terrorists hijack a Philippine Airlines plane, which lands later on the Zamboanga Airport; hostage crisis ends on May 23 as they explode a plane and a shootout followed, killing 3 of them as well as 10 passengers.

August
 August 17 – The Moro Gulf earthquake take place near the islands of Mindanao and Sulu, in the Philippines. The magnitude was calculated as being as high as 8.0 on the moment magnitude scale. According to reports, the earthquake was recorded around 16:10 UTC. At least 5,000 people died during the earthquake followed by tsunami.
 August 26 - Bernabe Buscayno also known as Kumander Dante of the New People's Army is arrested.
 August 29 – A boat capsized in Davao River, leaving 19 persons missing and presumed dead.

October
 October 16–17 – National referendum-plebiscite was called in which the majority of the barangay voters approved that Martial Law should be continued and ratified the proposed amendments to the Constitution substituting the Interim Batasang Pambansa for the Regular Batasang Pambansa, pursuant to Presidential Decrees Nos. 991, 1031, and 1032.

December
 December 23 – The Tripoli Agreement is signed.

Holidays

As per Act No. 2711 section 29, issued on March 10, 1917, any legal holiday of fixed date falls on Sunday, the next succeeding day shall be observed as legal holiday. Sundays are also considered legal religious holidays. Bonifacio Day was added through Philippine Legislature Act No. 2946. It was signed by then-Governor General Francis Burton Harrison in 1921. On October 28, 1931, the Act No. 3827 was approved declaring the last Sunday of August as National Heroes Day. As per Republic Act No. 3022, April 9th was proclaimed as Bataan Day. Independence Day was changed from July 4 (Philippine Republic Day) to June 12 (Philippine Independence Day) on August 4, 1964.

 January 1 – New Year's Day
 February 22 – Legal Holiday
 April 9 – Araw ng Kagitingan (Day of Valor)
 April 15 – Maundy Thursday
 April 16 – Good Friday
 May 1 – Labor Day
 June 12 – Independence Day 
 July 4 – Philippine Republic Day
 August 13 – Legal Holiday
 August 29 – National Heroes Day
 September 21 – Thanksgiving Day
 November 30 – Bonifacio Day
 December 25 – Christmas Day
 December 30 – Rizal Day

Entertainment and culture

Sports
 July 17–August 1 – The Philippines competed at the 1976 Summer Olympics in Montreal, Canada. The country sends only eleven athletes to Montreal, its smallest delegation since 1932, to compete in track and field, boxing, shooting, swimming and weightlifting.

Births
January 29 – Arnulf Bryan Fuentebella, politician
February 2 – Ana Roces, singer and actress
February 7 – Chito Miranda, singer-songwriter and frontman of Parokya ni Edgar
February 18 – Bernadette Sembrano, broadcast journalist
February 19 – Victor Neri, actor and chef
February 26 – Alex Crisano, basketball player
March 3 – Isabel Granada, actress and singer (d. 2017)
March 21 - Bamboo Mañalac, singer and musician
March 31 – Vice Ganda, comedian, host, and singer
April 2 – Geneva Cruz, singer and actress
April 4 – Bearwin Meily, actor, comedian, and magician
April 21 – Rommel Adducul, basketball player
May 2 – Alicia Mayer, model and actress
May 30 – Ebe Dancel, singer-songwriter and music arranger
June 4 – Buwi Meneses, Musician
August 11 – Jhong Hilario, actor and politician
August 28 – Acel Bisa, singer-songwriter and musician
September 3 – Karlo Nograles, lawyer and politician
September 6 – Mylene Dizon, actress
October 14 – Jayjay Helterbrand, basketball player
November 27 – Humerlito Dolor, politician
November 28 – Wynne Arboleda, basketball player
December 2 – Boom Labrusca, actor
December 3 – Bernard Palanca, actor
December 7 – Derek Ramsay, actor and model
December 8 – Danny Ildefonso, basketball player 
December 10 – Clem Castro, musician
December 17 – Ethel Booba, comedian and singer
December 24 – Donbel Belano, basketball player

Deaths
May 20 – Camilo Osías, politician (b. 1889)
June 12 – Guillermo Tolentino, sculptor and National Artist of the Philippines (b. 1890)
October 27 – José Yulo, Chief Justice of the Supreme Court of the Philippines (b. 1894)

References